The following is a list of cities, towns, villages and counties of Michigan that no longer exist as separate entities but are generally still inhabited.  Many of these were settlements that faded away or were swallowed up into larger adjoining communities.

Lost cities generally fall into three broad categories: those whose disappearance has been so complete that no knowledge of the city existed until the time of its rediscovery and has been studied, those whose location has been lost but whose memory has been retained in the context of myths and legends, and those whose existence and location have always been known, but which are no longer inhabited.

List
Lost towns are listed by their former name, the present-day county where they are located, and their location relative to present-day maps.  If further information about these communities is available it is included briefly as well.  This list is not comprehensive.
Village of Grape , Raisinville Township, Monroe County, on the north side of River Raisin, 6 miles west of present-day Monroe, Michigan
Village of Steiner , Frenchtown Township. Monroe County, at the intersection of the Norfolk Southern Railway and Steiner Roads, 4 miles north, northwest of Monroe
Village of Stoney Creek , Frenchtown Township, Monroe County, 4 miles north of Monroe, and east of where Interstate 75 crosses Stoney Creek
Standale ,  Kent County, near the intersection of M-45 and M-11 in Walker.  Formerly an independent, unincorporated community of some significance to the local area, it was in Walker Township, which incorporated as the City of Walker in the 1960s.  It still exists in the names of several businesses and churches, as well as the official name of the business district along Lake Michigan Drive.  Many locals still refer to their hometown as Standale, rather than Walker.
Kelloggsville,  Kent County, near the intersection of 44th St. and Division in the suburbs of Grand Rapids.  This was formerly a community of local significance, including its own still-existent school district (Kelloggsville Public Schools).  It was situated partially in Paris Township and partially in Wyoming Township.  These two townships incorporated as the cities of Kentwood  and Wyoming respectively, thus taking any official Kelloggsville designation with them, although there are still churches with that name, and many people within the area will refer to it as such.
Chestonia , Jordan Township, Antrim County, at the intersection of M-66 and East Old State Road. Chestonia grew up around a depot on the Detroit and Charlevoix Railroad that was founded in 1899. At one point, it boasted a post office, nearly 100 residents, and the junction of the East Jordan and Southern and Detroit and Charlevoix railroads. When the last of the railroad tracks in the town were removed in 1962, the depot and post office closed, and the town quickly declined. Today, nothing is left of the former townsite except for some old cement foundations near the old railroad grade.
Disco was located at what is now the junction of 24 Mile Road and Van Dyke Road. and was platted in 1849. The community never incorporated, although the local high school, the "Disco Academy" gained some recognition and a post office operated named Disco from May 5, 1854 until July 31, 1906. Only a few homes and a namesake on old county road maps remain of this now forgotten historic place. See "The Lost Village of Disco" on the Shelby Township Historical Society website.

References

Lost cities, towns, and counties
History of Michigan